Knockout is a 1941 American drama film directed by William Clemens and written by M. Coates Webster. The film stars Arthur Kennedy, Olympe Bradna, Virginia Field, Anthony Quinn, Cliff Edwards and Cornel Wilde. The film was released by Warner Bros. on March 29, 1941.

Plot
Johnny Rocket is an up-and-comer in the boxing game, but promoter Trego is unhappy at learning Johnny's planning to quit because that's what his fiancee Angela wants.

Trego uses his connections to make sure Johnny can't find a job. Now that wife Angela is expecting a baby, Johnny has no choice but to return to the ring. A newspaperwoman, Gloria Van Ness, tries to seduce Johnny, who resists at first. But as his record improves and his ego grows, Johnny begins to return Gloria's interest and loses Angela in the process. He also fires Trego, feeling he doesn't need anybody's help anymore.

A drugged mouthpiece, planted by Trego, causes Johnny to lose his next fight and give the appearance of taking a dive. He is suspended from boxing. When he tries to fight under an assumed name, he is knocked cold. Johnny comes to his senses in more ways than one when he learns that Angela has been paying his hospital bills. They are reunited, and Johnny quits boxing to go work at a children's summer camp.

Cast  
 Arthur Kennedy as Johnny Rocket
 Olympe Bradna as Angela Grinnelli
 Virginia Field as Gloria Van Ness
 Anthony Quinn as Trego
 Cliff Edwards as Pinky 
 Cornel Wilde as Tom Rossi
 Richard Ainley as Allison 
 William Edmunds as Louis Grinnelli
 Frank Wilcox as Denning
 John Ridgely as Pat Martin
 Ben Welden as Pelky
 Charles C. Wilson as Monigan 
 Edwin Stanley as Doctor

References

External links 
 
 
 
 

1941 films
Warner Bros. films
American drama films
1941 drama films
Films directed by William Clemens
American boxing films
American black-and-white films
1940s English-language films
1940s American films